The Well-Tech Award, also known as the “WT Award”, is an international award for technological innovation in design coordinated by Well-Tech Architecture & Design Studio in Milan, Italy, in collaboration with "Città metropolitana di Milano" and the Polytechnic University of Milan. The winning projects are selected by a committee of members from the event's sponsors, and the president of Milan Città Metropolitana authorities. The projects are exhibited during the Milan Furniture Fair event, also known as Milan Design Week.  The projects represent technological innovation, sustainability, accessibility, and contribution to a quality of life.

History
The Well-Tech Award was the initiative of the founder of Well-Tech Architecture & Design Studio, Chiara Canton, which opened in 1999 in Milan. The purpose of the award is to highlight ecologically sustainable systems that other companies can incorporate into their businesses.

In 2013, Well-Tech also started the Well-Tech SmartCity Award, an international competition focused on urban architecture projects for sustainable development.

Award Categories
Each year, Well-Tech awards prizes in the following three categories:
  
Accessibility
Sustainability
Quality of Life

Participants may submit up to three entries in each category. Examples of past submissions include ideas ranging from vehicles to home appliances, from clothing to toys, from eco-friendly materials to new forms of renewable energy.

Evaluation criteria

The Well-Tech Award annually selects sixty products that represent the best in technological innovation to improve quality of life, with particular attention to issues of sustainability and accessibility.

Accessibility criteria 
easy to use by vulnerable groups, elderly and disabled
secure visibility and easy understanding of the components
research and application of new ways to use products and services
qualitative values, functional and communicative of the product

Sustainability criteria 
Reduce consumption of materials and energy
Reduce waste throughout the life cycle of the product
Application of renewable energies and materials
Transformation of the mode of consumption as a function of reduced materials and energy
Continued investment and not just an episodic company on the content of sustainable development
Qualitative values functional and communicative of the product

Quality of Life criteria 
Applications of ergonomic parameters of materials and technologies that reduce the environmental impact
Applications of materials and technologies to optimize user comfort
Communicative product able to establish a relationship of empathy with the user
Appropriate use of materials and technology in the production system

Well–Tech Award Event
Each year, top products and projects submitted are showcased during the Milan Design Week. The event is organized by Well-Tech Architecture & Design Studio in collaboration with Milano Città Metropolitana. Each of the three categories has one first-place winner. In addition, up to six honorable mentions may be awarded.

Well-Tech Award winners
The following table show the category of the winning award, the company, institution or individual that designed the product, and the winning product.

References

Italian awards
Polytechnic University of Milan